Fernando José António Freitas Alexandrino (born 21 July 1947 in Benguela) is a former Portuguese footballer. He played as central defender.

Football career 
Freitas gained 9 caps for Portugal and made his debut 10 May 1972 in Nicosia against Cyprus, in a 1-0 victory.

External links 
 
 

1947 births
Living people
Portuguese footballers
Association football defenders
Primeira Liga players
C.F. Os Belenenses players
FC Porto players
Portimonense S.C. players
Portugal international footballers
People from Benguela